The 2018 Jiangxi International Women's Tennis Open was a professional tennis tournament played on hard courts. It was the 5th edition of the event, and part of the International category of the 2018 WTA Tour. It took place in Nanchang, China, from July 23 – 29, 2018.

Points and prize money

Point distribution

Prize money

Singles main draw entrants

Seeds

 Rankings are as of July 16, 2018

Other entrants
The following players received wildcards into the singles main draw:
  Yang Zhaoxuan
  Zhang Shuai
  Zheng Wushuang

The following players received entry using a protected ranking into the singles main draw:
  Margarita Gasparyan

The following players received entry from the qualifying draw:
  Hiroko Kuwata
  Liang En-shuo
  Peangtarn Plipuech
  Karman Thandi
  Xu Shilin
  Xun Fangying

The following players received entry as lucky losers:
  Momoko Kobori
  Junri Namigata

Withdrawals
  Jana Čepelová → replaced by  Ayano Shimizu
  Bojana Jovanovski Petrović → replaced by  Lu Jingjing
  Kristína Kučová → replaced by  Lu Jiajing
  Peng Shuai → replaced by  Jang Su-jeong
  Conny Perrin → replaced by  Momoko Kobori
  Arantxa Rus → replaced by  Ankita Raina
  Yang Zhaoxuan → replaced by  Junri Namigata

Retirements
  Vitalia Diatchenko

Doubles main draw entrants

Seeds

 Rankings are as of July 16, 2018

Other entrants
The following pairs received wildcards into the doubles main draw:
  Liu Yanni /  Yuan Yue
  Sun Xuliu /  Zheng Wushuang

Champions

Singles

  Wang Qiang def.  Zheng Saisai 7–5, 4–0 ret.

Doubles

  Jiang Xinyu /  Tang Qianhui def.  Lu Jingjing /  You Xiaodi, 6–4, 6–4

References
Official website
Jiangxi Nanchang History & Prize Money breakdown

2018
2018 WTA Tour 
2018 in Chinese tennis
July 2018 sports events in China